The Paraná Jê languages are a branch of the Jê languages constituted by the extinct language Ingain and by the Southern Jê languages (Kaingang and Laklãnõ (Xokléng)).

References

Jê languages
Languages of Brazil